Carlos Alberto Pereira da Silva (born November 12, 1977, in Vila Nova, Brazil), better known as Uranio Pereira, is a Brazilian former professional footballer who played as a midfielder.

Teams
 2 de Mayo 2006-2007
 Sportivo Trinidense 2007
 General Caballero 2008–

External links
 
 

1977 births
Living people
Brazilian footballers
Association football midfielders
General Caballero Sport Club footballers
Sportivo Trinidense footballers
Brazilian expatriate footballers
Brazilian expatriate sportspeople in Paraguay
Expatriate footballers in Paraguay